Petar Angelov (born 27 March 1897, date of death unknown) was a Bulgarian equestrian. He competed in two events at the 1936 Summer Olympics.

References

1897 births
Year of death missing
Bulgarian male equestrians
Olympic equestrians of Bulgaria
Equestrians at the 1936 Summer Olympics
Place of birth missing